The siege of Detroit, also known as the surrender of Detroit or the Battle of Fort Detroit, was an early engagement in the War of 1812. A British force under Major General Isaac Brock with Native American allies under Shawnee leader Tecumseh used bluff and deception to intimidate U.S. Brigadier General William Hull into surrendering the fort and town of Detroit, Michigan, along with his dispirited army which actually outnumbered the victorious British and Indians (the first nations of then to become Canada).

The British victory reinvigorated the militia and civil authorities of Upper Canada, who had previously been pessimistic and affected by pro-U.S. agitators. Many Indians in the Northwest Territory were inspired to take arms against U.S. outposts and settlers. The British held Detroit for more than a year before their small fleet was defeated on Lake Erie, which forced them to abandon the western frontier of Upper Canada.

Background

American plans and moves

Tension was increasing between the United Kingdom and the United States in the early months of 1812. Michigan Territory Governor William Hull urged President James Madison and Secretary of War William Eustis to form an army which would secure the Northwest Territory against Indians who were being incited by British agents and fur trading companies to take up arms against the United States. It was urgently necessary to reinforce the outpost of Detroit, which had a population of 800 and a garrison of 120 soldiers. It was also suggested that this army might invade the western districts of Upper Canada, where support might be expected from the many recent immigrants from the United States who had been attracted by generous land grants.

Madison and Eustis concurred with this plan and offered command of the army to Hull, an aging veteran of the American Revolutionary War. He was reluctant to take the appointment, but no other officer was available with his prestige and experience. He accepted after repeated pleas from Madison and was commissioned as a brigadier general in the United States Army. His army consisted of three regiments of Ohio militia under Colonels Lewis Cass, Duncan McArthur, and James Findlay. Hull took command of them at Dayton, Ohio on 25 May but found that they were badly equipped and ill-disciplined, and no arrangements had been made to supply them on the march. He made hasty efforts to remedy the deficiencies in equipment.

The army marched north from Urbana, Ohio, on 10 June, joined by the 4th U.S. Infantry under Lieutenant Colonel James Miller. Hull ignored an earlier route established by Anthony Wayne and created a new route to Detroit across the Great Black Swamp area of northwest Ohio. He received a letter from Eustis on 26 June that was dated 18 June, warning him that war was imminent and urging that he should make for Detroit "with all possible expedition", so he hastened his march. His draft horses were worn out by the arduous march, so he put his entrenching tools, medical supplies, officers' baggage, despatches, some sick men and the army's band aboard the packet vessel Cayahoga at the foot of the Maumee River, to be transported across Lake Erie.

Eustis had sent his first letter of 18 June by special messenger. Congress had passed the declaration of war later that day, but Eustis sent a letter with this vital information only by ordinary mail. On 28 June, the postmaster at Cleveland, Ohio hired an express rider to rush the letter to Hull but even this arrived only on 2 July. The British ambassador in Washington had sent the news urgently to Britain and Canada, and the military commanders in Canada had, in turn, hastened to inform all their outposts of the state of war.

Hull reached Detroit on 5 July, where he was reinforced by detachments of Michigan militia, including the 140 men of the Michigan Legionary Corps, which Hull had established in 1805. The American army was short of supplies, especially food, as Detroit provided only soap and whiskey. Nevertheless, Eustis urged Hull to attack Amherstburg. The fort there was defended by 300 British regulars, mainly from the 41st Regiment of Foot, 400 Indians, and some, principally Essex, militia. The post's commander was Colonel St. George, who was later superseded by Colonel Henry Procter of the 41st. Hull was not enthusiastic and wrote to Eustis that "the British command the water and the savages." Nevertheless, his army crossed into Canada on 12 July. He issued several proclamations which were intended to induce Canadians to join or support his army while some of his mounted troops raided up the Thames River as far as Moraviantown. These moves discouraged many of the militia from opposing his invasion, but few of the inhabitants of the region actively aided him, even those who had recently moved from the United States.

There were several indecisive skirmishes with British outposts along the Canard River. Hull decided that he could not attack the British fort without artillery, which could not be brought forward because the carriages had decayed and needed repair, and fell back. Several of his officers disagreed with this retreat and secretly discussed removing him from command. Hull had been quarreling with his militia colonels since taking over the army, and he felt that he did not have their support in the field or in their councils of war.

British moves

On 17 July, a mixed force of British regulars, Canadian fur traders, and Indians captured the important trading post of Mackinac Island on Lake Huron from its small American garrison who were not aware that war had been declared. Many of the Indians who had taken part in the attack either remained at Mackinac or returned to their homes, but 100 or more Sioux, Menominee, and Winnebago warriors began moving south from Mackinac to join those already at Amherstburg, while the news induced the previously neutral Wyandots living near Detroit to become increasingly hostile to the Americans. Hull learned of the capture of Mackinac on 3 August, when the paroled American garrison reached Detroit by schooner. He feared that this had "opened the northern hive of Indians" and so abandoned all the Canadian territory that he held.

Hull's supply lines ran for  along the Detroit River and the shore of Lake Erie, which was dominated by the British armed vessels, making them vulnerable to British and Indian raiders. A raiding party under Tecumseh ambushed and routed an American detachment under Major van Horne on 4 August at the Battle of Brownstown, capturing more of Hull's despatches. Hull sent a larger party under James Miller to clear his lines of communication and escort a supply convoy of 300 head of cattle and 70 pack horses loaded with flour, which was waiting at Frenchtown, Michigan under Major Henry Brush. Miller forced a British and Indian force under Major Adam Muir of the 41st Regiment to retreat some distance at the Battle of Maguaga on 9 August, but the British re-formed their line and he declined to resume the attack. Miller was ill and his losses in the engagement were heavier than those of the enemy, and he lost confidence and remained encamped near the battlefield until Hull ordered him to return to Detroit.

Meanwhile, British Major General Isaac Brock was in York, the provincial capital, dealing with the unwilling Legislative Assembly and mobilizing the province's militia. He had only a single regiment of regulars and some small detachments of veterans and artillery to support the militia, but he was aware that there was no immediate threat from the disorganized and badly supplied American forces on the Niagara River, or from the lethargic American commander in chief, Major General Henry Dearborn at Albany, New York. Hull's army alone was occupying or threatening Canadian territory. Late in July, Brock learned of the capture of Mackinac. He was also informed by Lieutenant General George Prevost, the Governor General of Canada, that an additional regiment was being dispatched to Upper Canada, although as piecemeal detachments. Brock dispatched 50 of his small force of regulars and 250 volunteers from the militia westward from York to reinforce Amherstburg. On 5 August, he prorogued the assembly and set out himself after them. He and his force sailed from Port Dover, Ontario in batteaux and open boats. They reached Amherstburg on 13 August, at the same time as 200 additional Indian warriors who joined Tecumseh (100 "Western Indians" from Mackinac and 100 Wyandots).

At Amherstburg, Brock learned from Hull's captured despatches that the morale was low in Hull's army, that they feared the numbers of Indians which might be facing them, and that they were short of supplies. Brock also established a rapport with Tecumseh, ensuring that the Indians would cooperate with his moves. Brock and Tecumseh met shortly after Brock arrived at Amherstburg, and legend has it that Tecumseh turned to his warriors and said, "Here is a man!" Brock wrote shortly afterwards, "a more sagacious and a more gallant Warrior does not I believe exist."

Brock determined on an immediate attack on Detroit, against the advice of most of his subordinates. The British had already played on Hull's fear of the Indians by arranging for a misleading letter to fall into American hands. The letter asked that no more Indians be allowed to proceed from Fort Mackinac, as there were already 5,000 at Amherstburg and supplies were running short. Brock sent Hull a demand for surrender, stating:

The force at my disposal authorizes me to require of you the immediate surrender of Fort Detroit. It is far from my intention to join in a war of extermination, but you must be aware, that the numerous body of Indians who have attached themselves to my troops, will be beyond control the moment the contest commences.

According to Brock's later report, his force included 600 warriors and 1300 soldiers (including those left to garrison Amherstburg and Sandwich), and two warships. Brock's carried out several bluffs to deceive the Americans into believing that there were more Indians and troops than there actually were. Major Thomas Evans at Fort George suggested that Brock give his militia the cast-off uniforms of the 41st Regiment to make Hull believe that most of the British force were regulars. The troops were told to light individual fires instead of one fire per unit, thereby creating the illusion of a much larger army. They marched to take up positions in plain sight of the Americans then quickly ducked behind entrenchments, and marched back out of sight to repeat the maneuver. The same trick was carried out during meals, where the line would dump their beans into a hidden pot, then return out of view to rejoin the end of the line.

Battle

On 15 August, gunners of the Provincial Marine set up a battery of one 18-pounder and two 12-pounder guns and two mortars on the Canadian shore of the Detroit River (in the grounds of the Francois Bâby House, formerly Hull's headquarters) and began bombarding Fort Detroit, joined by the armed vessel General Hunter and the 20-gun sloop-of-war . They were followed after daybreak by Brock's force, divided into three small "brigades". The first was composed of 50 men of the Royal Newfoundland Fencibles and some Lincoln and Kent militia; the second consisted of 50 men of the 41st Regiment with York, Lincoln, Oxford and Norfolk militia; the third was formed from the main body of the 41st (200 men) and 50 men of the Royal Artillery with five field guns (three 6-pounders and two 3-pounders). Elements of the Essex militia, which had been disheartened in the face of Hull's initial advance into Upper Canada, also constituted part of Brock's reinvigorated force. In total, Brock's army consisted of 330 regulars, 400 militia and 600 Native warriors.

Brock originally intended to occupy a fortified position astride Hull's supply line and wait for starvation and bombardment to force the Americans to surrender or come out to fight, but he then learned that Hull had sent a detachment of 400 men the previous day under Colonels Cass and McArthur to escort Brush's convoy to Detroit via a backwoods trail some distance from the lake and river, and this detachment was only a few miles from the British rear. (Hull had sent messengers recalling this force the night before, but Cass and MacArthur had already encamped for the night and declined to move.) To avoid being caught between two fires, Brock advanced immediately against the rear of Fort Detroit, the side farthest from the river where the defences were weakest. Tecumseh's warriors, meanwhile, paraded several times past a gap in the forest where the Americans could see them, while making loud war cries. Militia cavalry leader William Hamilton Merritt noted that "Tecumseh extended his men, and marched them three times through an opening in the woods at the rear of the fort in full view of the garrison, which induced them to believe there were at least two or three thousand Indians." Merritt was not an eyewitness, however, and this claim has been disputed.

As the British prepared to attack, a shell exploded in the officers' mess inside the fort, causing casualties. Hull despaired of holding out against a force which seemingly consisted of thousands of British regulars, because he was lacking adequate gunpowder and ammunition to withstand a long siege. A surrender would also save his 2,500 soldiers and 700 civilians, including his own daughter, from "the horrors of an Indian massacre", he wrote.

Hull hoisted a white flag of surrender against the advice of his subordinates. He sent messengers to Brock asking for three days to agree on terms of surrender. Brock replied that he would allow him three hours. Hull surrendered his entire force, including Cass's and McArthur's detachment and Major Brush's supply convoy. There were rumours that he had been drinking heavily prior to the surrender. He is reported to have said that the Indians were "numerous beyond example" and "more greedy of violence… than the Vikings or Huns."

Casualties and losses

The British bombardment killed seven Americans before the surrender, including Lieutenant Porter Hanks, the former commander of Fort Mackinac who was awaiting a court-martial. The answering fire from the guns of Fort Detroit wounded two British gunners. After Hull surrendered, the 1,600 Ohio militiamen from his army were paroled and escorted south until they were out of danger of attack from the Indians. Most of the Michigan militia had already deserted. The 582 American regulars were sent as prisoners to Quebec City.

Among the booty and military stores surrendered were 33 cannon, 300 rifles, 2,500 muskets, and the brig Adams, the only armed American vessel on the Upper Lakes. The British Navy put it into service, and it was briefly recaptured two months later near Fort Erie. An intense US and British artillery barrage ensued, causing a fire that ultimately destroyed the battered hulk.

Aftermath

British
Hull's surrender was startling on both sides of the border. On the American side, many Indians took up arms and attacked American settlements and isolated military outposts. In Upper Canada, the population and militia were encouraged, particularly in the Western districts where they had been threatened by Hull's army. Brock forgave the local militia for their reluctance to perform their duty, instead rewarding those militiamen who had remained at their posts. More materially, the 2,500 muskets captured from Hull were distributed among the ill-equipped militia.

The British gained an important post on American soil and won control over Michigan Territory and the Detroit region for most of the following year. Brock was hailed as a hero, and Tecumseh's influence was strengthened over the confederation of Indians. Brock next intended to mount a pre-emptive attack into New York State to forestall an American attack across the Niagara River. He was thwarted by an armistice arranged by Sir George Prevost. When this ended, the Americans attacked in October near Queenston, Ontario. Brock was killed at the ensuing Battle of Queenston Heights while leading a hasty counter-attack to recover a battery that had been captured by the Americans.

American
A third American invasion of Canada took place in November north of Lake Champlain. The Americans accidentally fired on each other in the dark, then retreated after a brief engagement at Lacolle Mills. The Vermont newspaper Green-Mountain Farmer wrote in January 1813: "The whole Canadian campaign had produced nothing but 'disaster, defeat, disgrace, and ruin and death'".

General Hull was tried by court martial and sentenced to death for his conduct at Detroit, but the sentence was commuted by President Madison to dismissal from the Army in recognition of his honorable service in the American Revolution. American attempts to regain Detroit were continually thwarted by poor communications and the difficulties of maintaining militia contingents in the field, until the Americans won a naval victory at the Battle of Lake Erie on 10 September 1813. This isolated the British at Amherstburg and Detroit from their supplies and forced them to retreat. Hull's successor Major General William Henry Harrison pursued the retreating British and their Indian allies and defeated them at the Battle of the Thames, where Tecumseh was killed.

Memorials
The British 41st Regiment (which is now perpetuated by the Royal Welsh Regiment) was awarded the battle honor "Detroit". The captured colors of the 4th U.S. Infantry are currently in the Welch Regiment Museum at Cardiff Castle. The patriotic song "The Bold Canadian" was written by a private on the campaign to commemorate conquering Detroit in Michigan Territory. Seven infantry, armored and artillery regiments of the Canadian Army carry the battle honor "Detroit" to commemorate the service of ancestor units in the campaign. In 2012, the Royal Canadian Mint released a 25¢ coin depicting Tecumseh to mark the War of 1812's bicentennial.

A bronze life-sized statue was unveiled on 7 September 2018 in Sandwich Towne, a neighborhood in Windsor, Ontario. It depicts Brock examining Detroit through a telescope while Tecumseh, mounted on horseback, is watching the British battery bombard the fort. The statue commemorates the partnership between the two leaders which resulted in the capture of Detroit, and was sculpted by Canadian Mark Williams, who also created the Provincial Marine monument at the King's Navy Yard in Amherstburg.

References

Footnotes

Bibliography

External links

 
 PBS Documentary on the War of 1812  features a chapter on Detroit.

1812 in the United States
History of Detroit
Sieges of the War of 1812
Battles of the War of 1812 in Michigan
Battles in the Old Northwest
Sieges involving the United Kingdom
August 1812 events
Events of National Historic Significance (Canada)